Primavera is an enterprise project portfolio management software. It includes project management,  scheduling, risk analysis, opportunity management, resource management, collaboration and control capabilities, and integrates with other enterprise software such as Oracle and SAP’s ERP systems. Primavera was launched in 1983 by Primavera Systems Inc. which was acquired by Oracle Corporation in 2008.

History

Products and versions 

As of 2008 Primavera Systems supported long-established products - P3 and Sure-Trak - and the newer P6 version. The long-standing P3 product in its various forms was used by 25% of the heavy construction industry, its predominant customer base; the next most popular software was used by 11%. Nearly 40% of general contractors with an annual revenue of $5M to $10M used Primavera P3. In comparison, the P6 version did not register in a CFMA 2008 survey of the United States construction industry.   The P3 version to P6 version change is based in a move from DOS-type shortcut keys to mouse-based icons. Thus, a software application that was once very fast to use but grounded in shortcut functions (which some users found difficult to master) moved to a mouse-based application that is quick to learn but once mastered never achieves the same speed of use.  The Primavera Project Planner DOS core launched in 1983 and the P3 Windows interface launched in 1994.

After a 27-year version life, Oracle ceased sales of the P3 and SureTrak versions on December 31, 2010.

In 2012, Primavera P6 EPPM Upgrade Release 8.2 added capabilities for governance, project-team participation, and project visibility. Mobile PPM was introduced through Primavera’s P6 Team Member for iPhone and Team Member Web Interface, to streamline communications between project team members in the field and in the office.  In addition, Primavera P6 Analytics Release 2.0 gained new enterprise-reporting tools and dashboards for monitoring and analyzing performance data, including geospatial analysis.  Organizations could also investigate comparative trends and cause-and-effect in multiple projects with Primavera Contract Management Release 14 as it included the report-writing capabilities of Oracle Business Intelligence Publisher.

In April 2013, Oracle Corporation announced the release of version 8.4 of Primavera P6 Enterprise Project Portfolio Management. This version incorporated material from Oracle's acquisitions of Skire and Instantis in 2012.

Use in ransomware
Primavera has been targeted by extortionists as a way to efficiently compromise digital business assets through fixable software security flaws, leading to a higher return in the usage of ransomware. A security patch is available for most of such exploits.

See also
 Project Portfolio Management
 List of acquisitions by Oracle

References

External links
 Primavera on Oracle website

Oracle software
Project management software
Risk analysis software